LeJuan Waynesley Simon (February 7, 1981 in Houston, Texas – October 1, 2008) was a Trinidad and Tobago triple jumper.

Athletic career

He finished fifth at the 2006 Commonwealth Games. He also competed at the 2004 Olympic Games without reaching the final.

His personal best jump was 16.87 metres, achieved in May 2002 in Odessa. He had 17.05 metres on the indoor track, achieved in March 2004 in Fayetteville. He also had 8.01 metres in the long jump, achieved in May 2004 in Baton Rouge.

Simon was a member of the Louisiana State University track and field team.

Death
LeJuan Simon died on October 1, 2008 in Baton Rouge, Louisiana from complications of primary pulmonary hypertension.

Competition record

References

1981 births
2008 deaths
Trinidad and Tobago male triple jumpers
Athletes (track and field) at the 2004 Summer Olympics
Olympic athletes of Trinidad and Tobago
LSU Tigers track and field athletes
People from Houston
Athletes (track and field) at the 2006 Commonwealth Games
Commonwealth Games competitors for Trinidad and Tobago
Athletes (track and field) at the 2007 Pan American Games
Pan American Games competitors for Trinidad and Tobago
Competitors at the 2006 Central American and Caribbean Games